Liberia is a historic plantation house located at Manassas, Virginia, United States. It was built about 1825, and is a two-story, five-bay, Federal style brick dwelling. It has a parapet side-gable roof and a molded brick cornice with a saw-tooth design.  It has a single-pile, modified central passage plan.  During the American Civil War, it was used as headquarters by both Confederate and Union forces. Both Presidents Abraham Lincoln and Jefferson Davis, in addition to other statesmen, visited Liberia during the War.

The house was acquired by the City of Manassas on December 31, 1986, for use as a museum. The house is being restored and is open for special events and tours by appointment.

It was added to the National Register of Historic Places in 1980.

References

External links
 Liberia Plantation – City of Manassas
 Liberia, 627 Centreville Road, Manassas, Manassas, VA: 4 photos at Historic American Buildings Survey

Plantation houses in Virginia
Historic American Buildings Survey in Virginia
Houses on the National Register of Historic Places in Virginia
Houses completed in 1825
Federal architecture in Virginia
Buildings and structures in Manassas, Virginia
Tourist attractions in Manassas, Virginia
Historic house museums in Virginia
National Register of Historic Places in Manassas, Virginia